Michele Cozzoli (3 May 1915 – 31 August 1961) was an Italian composer, conductor and arranger.

Biography 
Born in Naples, Cozzoli studied piano and violin under the composer Raffaele Caravaglios. After the military service, he made his professional debut as a conductor, before focusing into composing and arranging music for films and revues.

Cozzoli was also a songwriter, and some of his compositions participated to the Festival di Napoli and to the Sanremo Music Festival.

Selected filmography
 Falsehood (1952)
 Torna! (1953)
 The White Angel (1955)
 Sunset in Naples (1955)
 Sangue di zingara (1956)
 Mermaid of Naples (1956)
 Serenata a Maria (1957)
 Oh! Sabella (1957)
 Il Conte di Matera (1957)
 Cavalier in Devil's Castle (1959)
 World of Miracles (1959)
 The Pirate and the Slave Girl (1959)
 Pirates of the Coast (1960)
 Le signore (1960)
 Knight of 100 Faces (1960)
 Sword in the Shadows (1961)
 Guns of the Black Witch (1961)

References

External links

 

1915 births
1961 deaths
Musicians from Naples
20th-century Italian composers
Italian songwriters
Male songwriters
Italian music arrangers
Italian male conductors (music)
20th-century Italian conductors (music)
20th-century Italian male musicians